T. C. Yohannan (born 19 May 1947), in full Thadathuvila Chandapillai Yohannan, is a former Indian long jumper who held the national record in long jump for nearly 3 decades and represented India in the 1976 Summer Olympics in Montreal, Quebec, Canada. He hails from the state of Kerala. Yohannan will be known for the new dimension he gave to long jump in India in 1974, the occasion was the Tehran Asian Games of 1974. Yohannan cleared a distance of 8.07 metres at the Teheran Asian Games for a new Asian record.

Early life
Born at Maranadu village in Kollam district of Kerala on 19 May 1947, Yohannan had his early feel of athletics in the Inter-School Meets for Ezhukone Panchayat in 1964. He joined the public sector Bhilai Steel Plant, wherein he represented his Plant in the Steel Plants Sports Meet in 1969 and in the same year, had his first experience of athletics at the national level. He finished fourth in the long Jump and fifth in the triple jump. He progressed to the second spot in the long jump event of the Nationals in 1970 and then matured to set a national mark of 7.60 metres in Patiala in 1971.

Career
Selected to represent India in an international in Singapore, he won gold medals in both the long and triple jump. In 1972 he added the national triple jump title to his bag. His 7.78 metre jump created a new national record in 1973. He won the gold in Teheran Asian Games with an Asian record of 8.07. He was invited to Japan the next year and won gold medals in competition's at Tokyo, Hiroshima, Kobe and then repeated his success in championships in the Philippines and Sibu City. His last fling at international competition was at the Montreal Olympics in 1976. He hung up his shoes after that.

A diploma holder in Mechanical Engineering, Yohannan presently works as Assistant Public Relations Officer with the automobile giant TELCO.

Awards and honours
Besides the national honour conferred on him in the form of Arjuna Award in 1974, he has received numerous other awards which include a merit award from the Government of Kerala and the TelcoVeer award by his employers. He has also been honoured by the Bombay and Chennai Sports Journalists Association, Lions Club, Sportsweek and the Tata Sports Club of Bombay.

He is the father of former Indian cricketer Tinu Yohannan
His elder son Tisvy Yohannan is settled in Melbourne (Australia).

See also
List of Kerala Olympians

References

External links
 
 

Malayali people
Living people
Recipients of the Arjuna Award
Sportspeople from Kollam
Indian male long jumpers
1947 births
Athletes (track and field) at the 1974 Asian Games
Asian Games gold medalists for India
Asian Games medalists in athletics (track and field)
Athletes (track and field) at the 1976 Summer Olympics
Olympic athletes of India
Athletes from Kerala
Medalists at the 1974 Asian Games